Stray or The Stray or variation, may refer to:

Animals
 A feral (abandoned or escaped) domestic animal; see also estray
 A stray or free-ranging dog

Places
 Areas of open grassland in North Yorkshire:
 Strays of York
The Stray (Harrogate)
The Stray, an area of open grassland in Redcar

Film
 Strays (1991 film), an American made-for-television horror film
 Strays (1997 film), an American drama film by Vin Diesel
 A Stray, a 2016 film with Barkhad Abdi
 The Stray (film), 2017 film with Sarah Lancaster and Michael Cassidy
 Strays (2023 film), an upcoming live-action/animated comedy film

Television
 Strays (TV series), a spin-off of Kim's Convenience

Episodes
 "Stray" (Law & Order: Criminal Intent), an episode of Law & Order: Criminal Intent
 "Stray" (Smallville), an episode of Smallville
 "Strays" (The Shield), an episode of The Shield
 "The Stray" (Westworld), an episode of Westworld
 "Strays", an episode of One Day at a Time (2017 TV series)

Music 
 97.2 Stray FM, a radio station based in Harrogate, North Yorkshire, UK

Bands
 Stray (band), a 1966-1970s rock group from London, led by Del Bromham
 Stray, a side project by American band Unter Null

Albums
 Stray (album), an album by Aztec Camera
 Strays (Jane's Addiction album)
 Strays (Junkhouse album)
 Strays, a 2023 album by Margo Price

Songs
 "Stray", a song by Aztec Camera from the eponymous album Stray (album)
 "Stray", a song by Bradley Joseph from Rapture
 "Stray", a song by Yoko Kanno and Steve Conte used as the opening theme for the anime Wolf's Rain
 "Strays", a song by Jane's Addiction from the eponymous album Strays (Jane's Addiction album)
 "The Strays", a song by Sleeping With Sirens from the album Madness

Other uses 
 Stray (video game), a 2022 video game developed by BlueTwelve Studio
 Stray (novel), a novel by A.N. Wilson

See also

 
 
 Stray bullet